Raymond Pierre Eudes (10 October 1912 – 25 October 1980) was a French Canadian lawyer and politician.

Born in Montreal, Quebec, he was a lawyer before being elected to the House of Commons of Canada in the riding of Hochelaga in the 1940 election. A Liberal, he was re-elected in 1945, 1949, 1953, 1957, 1958, 1962, and 1963. He stepped down for the 1965 election to allow Gérard Pelletier to run. He was summoned to the Senate of Canada in 1968 representing the senatorial division of De Lorimier, Quebec. He served until his death in 1980.

Electoral record

External links
 

1912 births
1980 deaths
Canadian senators from Quebec
Lawyers from Montreal
Liberal Party of Canada MPs
Liberal Party of Canada senators
Members of the House of Commons of Canada from Quebec
Politicians from Montreal